Myzus obtusirostris, also known as Myzus (Myzus) obtusirostris, is an aphid in the superfamily Aphidoidea in the order Hemiptera. It is a true bug and sucks sap from plants.

References 

 http://animaldiversity.org/accounts/Myzus_obtusirostris/classification/
 https://hal.archives-ouvertes.fr/hal-00884699/document
 
 https://www.researchgate.net/publication/254291220_Studies_on_the_aphids_(Homoptera__Aphididae)_from_India_XXV._The_genus_Myzus_with_five_new_species_from_Eastern_India

Agricultural pest insects
Macrosiphini